Edward Joseph Tipper Jr. (3 August 1921 – 1 February 2017) was an enlisted man in Easy Company, 2nd Battalion, 506th Parachute Infantry Regiment in the 101st Airborne Division, United States Army during World War II. Tipper was one of the 140 original Toccoa men of Easy Company. Tipper was portrayed in the HBO miniseries Band of Brothers by Bart Ruspoli. Information about Tipper was featured in the 2009 book We Who Are Alive and Remain.

Early life
Tipper was born in Detroit, Michigan on 3 August 1921 to Lucy (McCormick) and Edward Tipper. The family moved back to Ireland when Tipper was three years old, but they returned to the United States later. Tipper graduated from a Detroit school in 1939 and worked at a department store.

Military service
After the attack on Pearl Harbor, Tipper signed up for the United States Marine Corps (USMC), but was rejected because his teeth could not bite together. He therefore volunteered for the paratroopers. He was sent to Toccoa, Georgia, and was assigned to Easy Company for training under Captain Herbert Sobel. During the training in Camp Mackall, Tipper was made Sobel's runner; with his help, "Sobel was able to mislay his maps, compass, and other items when he most needed them." Tipper received further training with Easy Company in Aldbourne, United Kingdom.
 
Tipper made his first combat jump into Normandy on D-Day, where he met with fellow Easy Company member Frank Mellet and some other paratroopers and engaged in a firefight with a German patrol. Later, the men and other paratroopers attacked the Marmion Farm. The soldiers held the farm before joining their own units.

Tipper fought in Carentan: after clearing a house, a mortar shell exploded near him when he was standing in the doorway. His right eye was destroyed and his legs were broken. Two other members of E Company dragged Tipper to a nearby aid station. Tipper was sent to a hospital in England, where his right eye was removed. He was then sent back to the United States.

Later life
Tipper was discharged in August 1945 after one year in army hospitals. At first Tipper needed to walk with a cane and wore an eyepatch. Tipper remembered how everybody wanted to do something to show support for the returning war veterans. For instance, someone would pay his bill for him at a restaurant or there would be no bill at all.

Tipper attended the University of Michigan and completed his master's degree in English at the University of Northern Colorado, and became a teacher. In 1961 he won the John Hay Fellowship from the University of California at Berkeley. When Tipper was sixty one, he met Rosie (who was then thirty four) and they were married on 12 February 1983. Their daughter Kerry Christina Tipper was born ten months later.

Tipper died on 1 February 2017 at the age of 95.

Medals and decorations

References

Bibliography

External links

1921 births
2017 deaths
American expatriates in Ireland
American people of Irish descent
Military personnel from Detroit
United States Army personnel of World War II
Band of Brothers characters
University of Michigan alumni
University of Northern Colorado alumni
American people with disabilities
Schoolteachers from Michigan
United States Army soldiers